The following list, derived from the statistics of the United Nations' Food and Agriculture Organization (FAO), lists the most valuable agricultural products produced by the countries of the world. The data in this article, unless otherwise noted, was reported for 2016. The value and production of individual crops varies substantially from year to year as prices fluctuate on the world and country markets and weather and other factors influence production.  

This list includes the top 50 most valuable crops and livestock products but does not necessarily include the top 50 most heavily produced crops and livestock products. Indigenous meat values have been omitted from this table.

References

Agricultural production
Most Valuable Crops
Agricultural production by commodity
Economy-related lists of superlatives